The 2016 CAMS Australian GT Championship was a CAMS-sanctioned Australian motor racing championship open to FIA GT3 cars. It was the 20th running of the Australian GT Championship. The championship began on 3 March 2016 at the Adelaide Street Circuit and ended on 13 November at Highlands Motorsport Park, with five rounds held in Australia and one round in New Zealand.

The 2016 season marked an expansion in Australian GT racing, with a separate endurance championship, the CAMS Australian Endurance Championship, being run for GT cars for the first time. A third series for older-specification GT3 and GT4 class cars, the CAMS Australian GT Trophy Series, was also held.

The Australian GT Championship events were held in support of V8 Supercar events, as part of rounds of the Shannons Nationals Motor Racing Championships and as self-promoted events. The Australian Endurance Championship also shared events with V8 Supercars and the Shannons Nationals, though its final two rounds were staged at Hampton Downs and Highlands Motorsport Park, both owned by series owner Tony Quinn. The Australian GT Trophy Series was contested exclusively at Shannons Nationals events.

Klark Quinn won the Australian GT Championship, Grant Denyer and Nathan Morcom were awarded the Australian Endurance Championship and Rob Smith won the Australian GT Trophy Series.

Series
The 2016 season included three separate series:
 CAMS Australian GT Championship, shorter races for current-specification GT3 cars.
 CAMS Australian Endurance Championship, longer endurance races featuring multiple drivers and current-specification GT3 cars.
 CAMS Australian GT Trophy Series, shorter races for older-specification GT3 and GT4 cars.

All competitors were able to enter the Australian GT Championship and the Australian Endurance Championship, and all were eligible to win the championships outright, however only older-specification cars could enter the Australian GT Trophy Series.

Teams and drivers

Australian GT Championship

Australian Endurance Championship

Australian GT Trophy Series

Race calendar
The Australian GT Championship was contested over six rounds, the Australian Endurance Championship over four rounds and the Australian GT Trophy Series over five rounds. Each race, with the exception of the Australian Grand Prix round of the Australian GT Championship, included at least one compulsory timed pit stop. The exception was the Australian Grand Prix round where drivers seeded time was added to the final race time.

Australian GT Championship

Australian Endurance Championship

Australian GT Trophy Series

Race results

Australian GT Championship

Australian Endurance Championship

Australian GT Trophy Series

Championship standings

Australian GT Championship

Gold Driver Cup

The Gold Driver Cup was for drivers over 40 years of age, competing solo and ranked Pro 4 or below.

Australian Endurance Championship
Grant Denyer and Nathan Morcom were awarded the Australian Endurance Championship.

Australian GT Trophy Series
Rob Smith won the Australian GT Trophy Series.

References

External links

Australian GT Championship
GT